Alison Joyce Wright (born 1 December 1949) is a former middle-distance runner from New Zealand who represented her country in the 1978 Commonwealth Games at 800m and 1500. She was born in Christchurch, New Zealand and attended Fendalton Open Air School in Christchurch, Fairfield College in Hamilton and Victoria University in Wellington, New Zealand.

Wright was the holder of the New Zealand 1000 meters record with a time of 2.38.54 set in the Berlin Olympic Stadium on 17 August 1979 until Angie Petty ran 2.37.28 in Tokyo in 2015. Although not recognised as a record at the time Alison's time was eventually ratified over 25 years later. In late 2011, Wright's time of 4:16.7 from January 1981 was also ratified as the official New Zealand women's indoor 1500 meter record though it remained the record for only a few months until it was beaten early in 2012 by Lucy van Dalen. Wright was also the 1500 meters national champion of New Zealand, Scotland and the United Kingdom (indoors).

Wright represented Oceania in the 1979 World Cup Finals in Montreal, Canada. She represented Scotland in the World Cross Country Championships in Madrid in 1981 and the United Kingdom in dual meets in 1981 and 1982. She achieved the 800 meter qualifying standard for the Moscow Olympic Games. Her selection was affected by the international boycott of those Games.

Personal bests

References

1949 births
New Zealand female middle-distance runners
Athletes (track and field) at the 1978 Commonwealth Games
Living people
Commonwealth Games competitors for New Zealand